This is a list of songs performed and/or recorded by members of the Canadian rock band Rush. The principal members of Rush were Alex Lifeson, Geddy Lee, and Neil Peart.

List

Solo projects

Alex Lifeson
Victor

Lerxst Demo Archives

Envy of None

Alex Lifeson

Geddy Lee

Neil Peart

Collaborations

Duo projects

Alex Lifeson and Geddy Lee

Trio projects

Alex Lifeson

Geddy Lee

Neil Peart

See also
 Rush discography

References

 
Rush